This list of the tallest buildings and structures in Kazakhstan ranks skyscrapers and towers in Kazakhstan by height.

Tallest buildings in Kazakhstan 
List of completed tallest buildings in Kazakhstan, including spires and architectural details which are above 100 metres in height.

Timeline of tallest buildings in Kazakhstan

See also
List of tallest buildings in Astana
List of tallest structures in Central Asia
List of tallest buildings in Asia

References 

Kazakhstan